Rudolf "Dolf" von Scheliha (31 May 1897 – 22 December 1942) was a German aristocrat, cavalry officer and diplomat who became a resistance fighter and anti-Nazi who was linked to the Red Orchestra. Von Scheliha fought in the World War I and this experience defined his politics. He joined the Foreign Office, trained to be a diplomat and was sent to the embassy in Warsaw. In the years leading up to the war, Von Scheliha was placed in a position of trust in the Foreign Office.  In 1934, he was recruited by Soviet intelligence while he served in Warsaw due to financial necessity, which enabled him to pass documents to Soviet intelligence. In the years leading up to the war, he became a committed opponent of the Nazi Regime and its anti-semitic policies.

He became the director of an information department in the embassy in September 1939 that was established to counter enemy propaganda. As part of the job, photographs of atrocities against Jews and other people passed through his department that were used for propaganda. Appalled at what he saw, he began to resist, building a portfolio of worst images over several years. In January 1942, the portfolio was smuggled to London.

In June 1941, at the start of the invasion of the Soviet Union, his line of communication to the Soviets was cut off. Soviet intelligence tried several times to reinitiate communications with Von Scheliha but were unsuccessful. In May 1942, Soviet intelligence sent the agent Erna Eifler to make contact with Scheliha in Berlin, but she was captured. He was executed by hanging in Plötzensee Prison on 14 December 1942.

Early life
Rudolf von Scheliha was born in Zessel, Oels, Silesia (now Cieśle, Gmina Oleśnica, Poland), as the son of a Prussian aristocrat and officer Rudolph von Scheliha. His mother was a daughter of Prussian Finance Minister Johann von Miquel. His younger sister, Renata von Scheliha, was a classic's philologist. Rudolf wed Marie Louise von Medinger, the daughter of a large landowner and industrialist. The couple had two daughters: Sylvia, born in 1930, and Elisabeth, born in 1934. Sylvia became an engineer and Elisabeth received a doctorate in chemistry, with the latter surviving to 2016 and dying in Adliswil.

Military
He served as an army officer in World War I, volunteered after his graduation in 1915. Scheliha volunteered at the same regiment, the Cavalry Rifle Regiment, Guard Cavalry Rifle Division, that his father and uncle had served in and whose influx for officers was drawn from nobility. On 8 August 1918, he was shelled in a ditch with two brothers next to him, who were blown up, one brother died months later from the injuries. Scheliha was buried; when rescued, his hair turned grey and was suffering shell shock. His parents were shocked at the change.  He never spoke of his experiences. He was honoured for his efforts with both Iron Crosses and the Silver Wound Badge.

Career

Until 1933
After the war, he studied law in Breslau. In May 1919, he moved to the University of Heidelberg, where he joined the Corps Saxo-Borussia during that year and came in contact with Republican and anti-totalitarian circles; He was elected to the AStA, the Association of Heidelberg Associations, where he vehemently opposed too the anti-Semitic riots by the students.

After his examination in 1921, he became first clerk at the Court of Appeal; in 1922. In February 1922, Rudolf von Scheliha joined the regional office of the Foreign Office in Hamburg. After six months, he was promoted to attaché.  He began to work in the department responsible for East European affairs, in the office of Undersecretary of State  in Berlin. In December 1924, he was promoted again, when he was admitted into the diplomatic service. In following years, Von Scheliha took over tasks in the diplomatic missions of Prague, Constantinople, Angora, Katowice and Warsaw. In 1927, he was appointed to the position of legation secretary.

A few months after Adolf Hitler's appointment as Reichskanzler in January 1933, von Scheliha became a member of the Nazi Party, a requirement as a diplomat. In 1935, von Scheliha participated in the Nuremberg Rally.

1933 to 1942
From 1932 to 1939, von Scheliha was a member of the German embassy in Warsaw. In September 1939, von Scheliha was appointed director of an information department in the Foreign Office, created to counter foreign press and radio news propaganda about the German occupation in Poland. His appointment allowed him to verify the veracity of foreign reports and to interview Nazi officials. In that position, he would often protest to Nazi agencies against German war crimes in Poland. As well as being critical of Kliest, he disagreed with the brutality of Richard Heydrich and Hans Frank and started to resist.

He also helped Poles and Jewish folk flee abroad. He became aware of the atrocities committed by the Third Reich under the Nazi regime and made contact with Polish nobles and intellectuals. Working either in an official capacity, or a friend, he helped many people to escape from Poland, in some cases providing money for travel costs. He remained capable of establishing several partial contacts after the beginning of the invasion of Poland on 1 September 1939, utilising them to disseminate news concerning Nazi crimes abroad.

Soviet agent
In 1937, von Scheliha, who had risen to become the First Secretary at the German embassy in Warsaw, began working for the Soviet secret police, the NKVD. His first case officer, if not recruiter, was Rudolf Herrnstadt, a journalist for the left-wing Berliner Tageblatt. As Herrnstadt was Jewish, contact with von Scheliha became increasingly difficult and an intermediary who would not be recognised was needed. Ilse Stöbe, a communist who was a secretary to Theodor Wolff for the newspaper Berliner Tageblatt, agreed to act as a cutout. Herrnstadt passed the documents that von Scheliha supplied to the Soviet Embassy in Warsaw by Stöbe until September 1939.

Scheliha's motivation for espionage were entirely financial, as he had a lifestyle beyond his salary, was a long-time gambler with gambling debts and liked to keep several mistresses at once. He found that selling state secrets to the Soviet Union was the best way of providing the additional income that he needed. Scheliha was paid well for his work; in February 1938, a Soviet agent deposited US$6,500 in his bank account in Zurich, making him the best paid Soviet agent in the world. It was from the intelligence sold by Scheliha that the Soviet Union became very well-informed about the state of German-Polish relations in 1937–1939 and that in October 1938, the Reich wanted to reduce Poland to a satellite state.

Archive
Von Scheliha secretly began making a collection of documents on the atrocities of the Gestapo in 1939, particularly on the murders of Jews in Poland, which also contained photographs of the newly-established extermination camps. In June 1941, he showed the dossier to the Polish intelligence agent Countess Klementyna Mankowska, who was a member of the anti-Nazi group, the Muszkieterowie ("Musketeers") where she worked as a courier. Countess  Mankowska visited him at the Foreign Office in Berlin to make the details known to the Polish Resistance and the Allies. Mankowska writes that she was led into a large well furnished room and Von Scheliha presented a large thick folder that described the gassing of Jews and other folk.

In the autumn of 1941, von Scheliha invited his Polish friend, Count Konstantin Bninski, to Berlin, under the pretext of writing propaganda texts for the Foreign Office against the Polish Resistance. The German diplomat and historian Ulrich Sahm considered it probable in his 1990 biography that von Scheliha then passed material to Bninski containing a comprehensive documentation of crimes during the German occupation, in addition to members of the Polish resistance. Co-authored with fellow German diplomat Johann von Wühlisch, it was completed in January 1942 and was titled The Nazi Culture in Poland. The document was recorded on microfilm and smuggled to Britain, with a high personal risk to those involved. It is considered one of the most detailed contemporary accounts of the early Holocaust in Eastern Europe during the war. The document describes the persecution of the church, school and the university system; the dark role of the Institute of German Ostarbeiter as the driver of cultural rescheduling; the relocation and the sacking of libraries; the devastation of monuments; the looting of archives, museums and the private collections of Polish nobility; the subversion of Polish theatre, music and the press; and the destruction of other cultural institutions under force by the Nazi Party. The Polish government-in-exile published the document as a novel in 1944 to 1945. Around then, von Scheliha was in contact with Generalmajor Henning von Tresckow who was also becoming increasingly antifascist, as he witnessed the murder of Jews and would later take part in the 20 July plot.

In February 1942, von Scheliha ended his attempts to name and send out exiled Poles as helpers for German propaganda to stop endangering them and himself. At the same time, he closed the small Polish research department foreign office, fearing for their lives. At that time he was in despair, realising his powerlessness. That spring, he travelled to Switzerland where his sister lived and provided Swiss diplomats with information on Aktion T4, including sermons by Bishop Clemens August Graf von Galen on the murders of the mentally ill. He also sent reports on the Final Solution, including the construction and the operation of more extermination camps and Hitler's order to exterminate European Jews. As part of the February trip to Switzerland, he banked part of his espionage earnings. It is calculated that he was paid about $50,000 for his services, but it was believed by the Germans who captured him that most of the money was consumed in domestic expenses, but at least some of it was banked. Von Scheliha made further trips to Switzerland in September and October 1942.

The extent of Soviet intelligence interest in von Scheliha was shown in May 1942 when Bernhard Bästlein assisted Erna Eifler, Wilhelm Fellendorf, Soviet agents who had parachuted into Germany in May 1942 with wireless telegraphy sets and had been instructed to find Ilse Stöbe to re-establish communications with von Scheliha. Eifler failed to contact Stöbe, who was in Dresden at the time. Eifler was arrested on 15 October 1942, Fellendorf a short time later. Another Soviet agent Heinrich Koenen was dropped on 23 October 1942 to make another attempt to contact Stöbe and von Scheliha. Koenen's mission was to pass all the material collected by von Scheliha and Stoebe to Soviet intelligence, but he was arrested in Berlin on 26 October 1942.

Unbeknownst to Stöbe and von Scheliha, the Gestapo had already started to arrest members of the Red Orchestra in August 1942. Stöbe was arrested on 12 September 1942, and von Scheliha was arrested on 29 October 1942 in the office of the personnel director of the Foreign Office shortly after he had returned from Switzerland.

Arrest and death
Suspected by the Gestapo for his critical attitude, he was charged by the Second Senate of the Reichskriegsgericht of being a member of the Red Orchestra and sentenced to death on 14 December 1942 for "treason". On 22 December 1942, he was executed by hanging in Plötzensee Prison

His wife, Marie Louise, was arrested on 22 December 1942 and taken to the women's prison in Charlottenburg. There, she was repeatedly interrogated and threatened but released on 6 November 1943. In the last days of the war, she fled with her daughters to Niederstetten via Prague. In Haltenbergstetten Castle, the former castle of the principality of Hohenlohe-Jagstberg, the family lived in a cellar mainly on mushrooms, berries and fruit.

Reappraisal

In West German historiography, von Scheliha was seen until 1986 as not a resistance fighter, but a spy in Soviet services. In the process, the acts of interrogation and Gestapo records continued to be uncritically classified as "sources" to which former Nazi prosecutors such as Manfred Roeder and Alexander Kraell, the former president of the Second Senate of the Reichskriegs Court, contributed after 1945.

Awards and honours

On 20 July 1961, the Foreign Office in Bonn commemorated eleven of its employees, who were executed as resistance fighters, with a plaque, including Albrecht Graf von Bernstorff, Ulrich von Hassell, Adam von Trott zu Solz and Friedrich-Werner Graf von der Schulenburg. Von Scheliha was not mentioned because he continued to pass on information to the Soviet Union, which was considered a betrayal. Only recent research on the Red Orchestra, especially the biography by Ulrich Sahm, has revised the assessment. In response, the Cologne Administrative Court ruled in October 1995 that Scheliha had been sentenced to death not for espionage but in a sham trial for his opposition to Nazism, which overturned the 1942 verdict.

On 21 December 1995 at the Foreign Office, in a ceremony with State Secretary Hans-Friedrich von Ploetz, an additional board with the inscription "Rudolf von Scheliha 1897–1942" was attached.

On 18 July 2000 in a ceremony at the new Foreign Office in Berlin, both panels were brought together and the names listed in the sequence of death dates. Von Scheliha's name leads the list. On 9 July 2014 Ilse Stöbe received the same honour at the Foreign Office.

In Neuallermöhe, a street was named in memory of von Scheliha on 5 May 1997. There is a street in Gotha named Schelihastraße, but the street is named after the Oberhofmeister Ludwig Albert von Scheliha, who owned a large garden plot on the street on which the Protestant church stands today.

Literature
 
 
 
 
  (Lars Jockheck: Rezension. In: sehepunkte. 3, 2003, Nr. 4.)
 
 
 
 
 Wolfgang Wippermann: Widerstand für Polen und Juden – Rudolf von Scheliha. [Resistance for Poles and Jews – Rudolf von Scheliha] In: Sebastian Sigler (Hrsg.): Corpsstudenten im Widerstand gegen Hitler. Duncker & Humblot, Berlin 2014,  pp. 191–215.

External links

References

1897 births
1942 deaths
German diplomats
Red Orchestra (espionage)
German Army personnel of World War I
People condemned by Nazi courts
People from the Province of Silesia
People executed for treason against Germany
People from Oleśnica County
Executed German people
People executed by hanging at Plötzensee Prison
German spies for the Soviet Union
World War II spies for the Soviet Union
Executed spies